Rudra is a Rigvedic deity associated with Shiva, the wind or storms, Vayu, medicine, and the hunt. One translation of the name is 'the roarer'. In the Rigveda, Rudra is praised as the 'mightiest of the mighty'. Rudra means "who eradicates problems from their roots". Depending upon the periodic situation, Rudra can mean 'the most severe roarer/howler' 
(could be a hurricane or tempest) or 'the most frightening one'. This name appears in the Shiva Sahasranama, and R. K. Sharma notes that it is used as a name of Shiva often in later languages. The Shri Rudram hymn from the Yajurveda is dedicated to Rudra and is important in the Shaivism sect. In Prathama Anuvaka of Namakam (Taittiriya Samhita 4.5), Sri Rudram the 'mightiest of the mighty' Rudra, is revered as Sadasiva (meaning 'mighty Shiva') and Mahadeva. Sadashiva is the Supreme Being, Lord Paramashiva in the Mantra marga Siddhanta sect of Shaivism. Also, the name Shiva is used many times in the same Anuvaka for invoking Rudra.

Etymology
The etymology of the theonym Rudra is somewhat uncertain. It is usually derived from the Proto-Indo-European (PIE) root rud- (related to English rude), which means 'to cry, howl'. The name Rudra may thus be translated as 'the roarer'. An alternative etymology suggested by Prof. Pischel interprets Rudra as the 'red one', the 'brilliant one', possibly derived from a lost root rud-, 'red' or 'ruddy', or alternatively, according to Grassman, 'shining'.

Stella Kramrisch notes a different etymology connected with the adjectival form raudra, which means 'wild', i.e., of rude (untamed) nature, and translates the name Rudra as 'the wild one' or 'the fierce god'.  R. K. Śarmā follows this alternative etymology and translates the name as 'the terrible' in his glossary for the Shiva Sahasranama. Mallory and Adams also mention a comparison with the Old Russian deity Rŭglŭ to reconstruct a Proto-Indo-European wild-god named *Rudlos, though they remind that the issue of the etymology remains problematic: from PIE *reud- ('rend, tear apart'; cf. Latin rullus, 'rustic'), or *reu- ('howl').

The commentator  suggests six possible derivations for rudra. However, another reference states that Sayana suggested ten derivations. The adjective shivam in the sense of 'propitious' or 'kind' is applied to the name Rudra in RV 10.92.9.

Rudra is called 'the archer' and the arrow is an essential attribute of Rudra. This name appears in the Shiva Sahasranama, and R. K. Śarmā notes that it is used as a name of Shiva often in later languages. The word is derived from the Sanskrit root - which means 'to injure' or 'to kill', and Śarmā uses that general sense in his interpretive translation of the name  as 'One who can kill the forces of darkness'.

In other contexts the word rudra can simply mean 'the number eleven'. The word rudraksha (Sanskrit:  = rudra and  'eye'), or 'eye of Rudra', is used as a name for both the berry of the rudraksha tree and a name for a string of the prayer beads made from those seeds.

Rudra is one of the names of Vishnu in Vishnu Sahasranama. Adi Shankara in his commentary to Vishnu Sahasranama defined the name Rudra as 'One who makes all beings cry at the time of cosmic dissolution'.  Author D. A. Desai in his glossary for the Vishnu Sahasranama says, Lord Vishnu in the form of Rudra is the one who does the total destruction at the time of great dissolution. This is only the context known where Vishnu is revered as Rudra.

Rigvedic hymns
The earliest known mentions of the Vedic deity Rudra , occur in the Rigveda, where three entire hymns are devoted to him. There are about seventy-five references to Rudra in the Rigveda overall.

Form of Lord Rudra
In the Rigveda are verses which speak about the form of Rudra. Some of them are:

Epithets of fierceness and fright
In the Rigveda, Rudra's role as a frightening god is apparent in references to him as ghora ('extremely terrifying'), or simply as asau devam ('that god'). He is 'fierce like a terrific wild beast' (RV 2.33.11). Chakravarti sums up the perception of Rudra by saying: 'Rudra is thus regarded with a kind of cringing fear, as a deity whose wrath is to be deprecated and whose favor curried'.

RV 1.114 is an appeal to Rudra for mercy, where he is referred to as 'mighty Rudra, the god with braided hair'.

In RV 7.46, Rudra is described as armed with a bow and fast-flying arrows, although many other weapons are known to exist. As quoted by R. G. Bhandarkar, the hymn declare that Rudra discharges 'brilliant shafts which run about the heaven and the earth' (RV 7.46.3), which may be a reference to lightning.

Rudra was believed to cure diseases, and when people recovered from them or were free of them, that too was attributed to the agency of Rudra. He is asked not to afflict children with disease (RV 7.46.2) and to keep villages free of illness (RV 1.114.1). He is said to have healing remedies (RV 1.43.4), as the best physician of physicians (RV 2.33.4), and as possessed of a thousand medicines (RV 7.46.3). So he is described with an alternative name, Vaidyanatha (Lord of Remedies).

Epithets of supreme rule

A verse from the Rig Veda (RV 2.33.9) calls Rudra 'The Lord or Sovereign of the Universe' (īśānādasya bhuvanasya):
sthirebhiraṅghaiḥ pururūpa ughro babhruḥ śukrebhiḥ pipiśehiraṇyaiḥ
īśānādasya bhuvanasya bhūrerna vā u yoṣad rudrādasuryam (RV 2.33.9)

With firm limbs, multiform, the strong, the tawny adorns himself with bright gold decorations:
The strength of Godhead never departs from Rudra, him who is Sovereign of this world, the mighty.

A verse of Śrī Rudram (= Yajurveda 16.18) speaks of Rudra as Lord of the Universe: 

Another verse (Yajurveda 16.46) locates Rudra in the heart of the gods, showing that he is the inner Self of all, even the gods: 

In a verse popularly known as the Mahamrityunjaya Mantra, both Rig Veda (7.59.12) and Yajur Veda (3.60) recommend worshipping Rudra to attain moksha (liberation):

In the Taittiriya Aranyaka of Yajur Veda (10.24.1), Rudra is identified as the universal existent ('all this') and thus as the Purusha (Supreme Person or inner Self) of the Vedas:

The Taittiriya Aranyaka of Yajur Veda 1.10.1 identifies Rudra and Brihaspati as Sons and companions of Bhumi (Earth) and Heaven:

Relation to other deities
Rudra is used both as a name of Shiva and collectively ('the Rudras') as the name for the Maruts. Maruts are 'storm gods' associated with the atmosphere. They are a group of gods whose number varies from two to sixty, sometimes also rendered as eleven, thirty-three or a hundred and eighty in number (i. e., three times sixty. See RV 8.96.8.).

The Rudras are sometimes referred to as 'the sons of Rudra' while Rudra is referred to as 'Father of the Maruts' (RV 2.33.1).

Rudra is mentioned along with a litany of other deities in RV 7.40.5. Here is the reference to Rudra, whose name appears as one of many gods who are called upon:

One scholiast's interpretation of the Sanskrit word , meaning 'ramifications' or 'branches', is that all other deities are, as it were, branches of Vishnu, but, Ralph T. H. Griffith cites Ludwig as saying, 'This [...] gives no satisfactory interpretation' and cites other views which suggest that the text is corrupt at that point.

Post-Rigvedic hymns

In the various recensions of the Yajurveda is included a litany of stanzas praising Rudra: Maitrāyaṇī-Saṃhitā 2.9.2, Kāṭhaka-Saṃhitā 17.11, Taittirīya-Saṃhitā 4.5.1 and Vājasaneyi-Saṃhitā 16.1–14. This litany is subsequently referred to variously as the Śatarudriyam and the Namakam (because many of the verses commence with the word namaḥ, meaning 'homage'), or simply the Rudram. This litany was recited during the Agnicayana ritual ('the piling of Agni'), and it later became a standard element in Rudra liturgy.

A selection of these stanzas, augmented with others, is included in the Paippalāda-Saṃhitā of the Atharvaveda (PS 14.3–4). This selection, with further PS additions at the end, circulated more widely as the Nīlarudram (or Nīlarudra Upaniṣad).

The Hindu god Shiva shares several features with Rudra. The theonym Shiva originated as an epithet of Rudra and the adjective shiva ('kind') is used euphemistically of Rudra, who also carries the epithet Aghora, Abhayankar (' non terrifying'). Usage of the epithet shiva came to exceed the original theonym by the post-Vedic period (in the Sanskrit Epics), and the name Rudra has been taken as a synonym for the god Shiva to where the two names are used interchangeably.

Shri Rudram

The president of the Ramakrishna Mission, at Chennai, in commentating on the foreword to Swami Amritananda's translation of Sri Rudram and Purushasuktam, states, 'Rudra to whom these prayers are addressed is not a sectarian deity, but the Supreme Being who is omnipresent and manifests Himself in myriad forms for the sake of the diverse spiritual aspirants'. Shri Rudram occurs in the fourth Kanda of the Taittiriya Samhita in the Yajurveda.
It is a preeminent Vedic hymn to Shiva as the God of dissolution and it is chanted daily in Shiva temples throughout India.

The prayer depicts the diverse aspects of the Almighty. The Shri Rudram hymn is unique in that it shows the presence of divinity throughout the entire universe. We cannot confine the qualities of the divine to those that are favourable to us. The Lord is both garden and graveyard, the slayer and the most benevolent one. The Almighty is impartial and ubiquitous.

In the hymn, Rudra is described as the most dreaded terroriser (frightening). Shri Rudram describes Rudra the Vedic deity as the personification of 'terror'. The name Rudra comes from ru, meaning 'Roar or howl' (the words dreaded or fearsome could only be used as adjectives to Rudra and not as Rudra because Rudra is the personification of terror) and dra, which is a superlative meaning 'the most'. So Rudra, depending on the poetic situation, can mean 'the most severe roarer/howler' or a hurricane or tempest or 'the most frightening one'.

Rudra and Shiva

Shiva as known today shares many features with Rudra, and Shiva and Rudra are viewed as the same personality in Hindu scriptures. The two names are used synonymously. Rudra, the god of the roaring storm, is usually portrayed in accordance with the element he represents as a fierce, destructive deity.

The oldest surviving text of Hinduism is the Rig Veda, which is dated to between 1700 and 1100 BC based on linguistic and philological evidence. A god named Rudra is mentioned in the Rig Veda. The name Rudra is still used as a name for Shiva. In RV 2.33, he is described as the 'Father of the Rudras', a group of storm gods.

Hymn 10.92 of the Rigveda states that the deity Rudra has two natures, one wild and cruel (rudra), and another that is kind and tranquil (shiva). The Vedic texts do not mention a bull or any other animal as the vehicle (vahana) of Rudra or of any other deities. On the other hand, post-Vedic texts such as the Mahabharata and the Puranas mention Nandi the bull and the zebu as the vehicles of Rudra and of Shiva, thereby unmistakably linking them as the same.

In Buddhism
In Tibetan Buddhism, according to the Padma Thang Yig, Rudra is a demon, formerly a human monk of noble origin named Koukuntri and then Tharpa Nakpo, who misunderstands dharma and engages in a life of vice and is condemned to Naraka. After 20.000 impure lives, he is eventually reborn as a demon in Sri Lanka by a prostitute who sleeps with three kinds of supernatural creatures, giving him three heads. His birth brings about plague and famine, so he is banished to a charnel ground, but he survives by devouring his mother's corpse and returns in order to conquer the world. Becoming the lover of the rakshasha queen Krodhishvari, he battles the gods, who are terrified of his extraordinary power and call the Buddhas and boddhisattvas for help.

The Buddha Vajrasattva, who in a previous life was Tharpa Nakpo's master Thupka Zhonu, receives the mission to destroy Rudra, for which he is accompanied by Vajrapani, himself a reborn Pramadeva or Denphak, Nakpo's servant and fellow disciple. They both assume the wrathful forms Hayagriva and Vajravarahi, who challenge Rudra with nine dances and battle him. Hayagriva turns diminutive and enters Rudra's anus, after which he becomes gigantic and destroys his body from inside out, submitting the demon and converting him as a dharma.

In another version, Hayagriva impersonates Rudra and sleeps with Krodishvari, and is reborn as the resultant child, Vajrarakshasha. He takes over Rudra's realm and defeats him by plunging a three-pointed khaṭvāṅga into his chest. He then devours Rudra, purifies him in his stomach and excretes him as a protector of dharma, who hands over his army of demons to him as attendants. Other versions replace Hayagriva with Ucchusma, an emanation that Vajrapani draws from his own anus.

In Sikhism
The 10th Sikh Guru, Guru Gobind Singh, describes the incarnation of Rudra in a composition titled 'Rudra Avtar' in his book the Dasam Granth.

See also
 Rigvedic deities
 Rudra (spider), a genus of spiders named after the deity
 Rudra Sampradaya
 Vayu, Hindu wind god
 Fūjin, Shinto Kami of winds
 Aeolus (Odyssey)

Notes

References

Encyclopaedia of Hindu Gods and Goddesses Suresh Chandra.

 This revised edition updates H. H. Wilson's translation by replacing obsolete English forms with more modern equivalents, giving the English translation along with the original Sanskrit text in Devanagari script, along with a critical apparatus.  

 (Second Revised Edition; Reprint, Delhi, 2002).
 The version provided by Chidbhavananda is from chapter 17 of the Anuśāsana Parva of the Mahābharata.
 

 

 
 Includes Śivasahasranāmakoṣa, a dictionary of names. This work compares eight versions of the Śivasahasranāmāstotra. The preface and introduction (in English) by Ram Karan Sharma provide an analysis of how the eight versions compare with one another. The text of the eight versions is given in Sanskrit.

External links
Rudra-sampradaya; Vaniquotes (His Divine Grace A. C. Bhaktivedanta Swami Prabhupāda's compiled teachings)

 

Forms of Shiva
Health gods
Hindu gods
Hunting gods
Rigvedic deities
Sky and weather gods
Wind gods
Death gods
Destroyer gods
Time and fate gods
Animal gods
Fortune gods
Mythological archers